"The Ghost Ship" is the third episode of Stingray, a British Supermarionation television series created by Gerry and Sylvia Anderson and filmed by their production company AP Films. Written by Alan Fennell and directed by Desmond Saunders, it was first broadcast on 18 October 1964 on ATV London.

The series follows the missions of the World Aquanaut Security Patrol (WASP), an organisation responsible for policing the Earth's oceans in the mid-2060s. Headquartered at the self-contained city of Marineville on the West Coast of North America, the WASP operates a fleet of vessels led by Stingray: a combat submarine crewed by Captain Troy Tempest, Lieutenant "Phones" and Marina, a mute young woman from under the sea. Stingrays adventures bring it into contact with undersea civilisations – some friendly, others hostile – as well as mysterious natural phenomena.

In "The Ghost Ship", the Stingray crew encounter a seemingly deserted galleon while investigating the disappearance of an ocean liner.

Plot
The ocean liner Arcadia disappears at sea. Her final radio transmission – in which the crew reported seeing an old galleon – reaches World Security Patrol Headquarters, who relay it to the World Aquanaut Security Patrol (WASP) in Marineville with orders to investigate. Captain Troy Tempest (voiced by Don Mason), Phones (voiced by Robert Easton) and Marina set off in Stingray accompanied by Commander Shore (voiced by Ray Barrett).

Stingray arrives at Arcadias last known position and encounters the galleon, which does not respond to Troy's hails. Shore and Phones board the ship and find its upper decks deserted. However, they fail to notice a platform built into the floor of one of the cabins and are lowered into a watertight section in the vessel's depths. There, they are held at gunpoint by an undersea pirate called Idotee, who reveals that he has converted the galleon into a submarine and that he used its cannons to sink Arcadia. Idotee now intends to kill the Stingray crew for their crimes against the undersea races.

Idotee instructs Shore to radio Troy and tell him to come aboard, but Shore disobeys and orders Troy to attack the galleon. Troy is unwilling to do either and submerges Stingray to evade the furious Idotee's cannon fire. Submerging the galleon, Idotee threatens to kill Shore and Phones unless Troy surrenders. Forced to comply, Troy puts on his diving suit and exits Stingray. He enters the galleon through an airlock and is greeted by Idotee, who never intended to let Shore and Phones live and has tied them to chairs in front of a double-barrelled harpoon that is about to fire spears at them. Idotee has a slower death in mind for Troy but is unaware that the captain has set in motion an emergency plan: only one of his two diving cylinders contains air, and the other, which the captain has opened, is releasing laughing gas into the room. While Idotee, Shore and Phones collapse into hysterics and eventually pass out, Troy, who has taken a pill to negate the effects of the gas, kicks the harpoon aside just before it shoots the spears, saving Shore and Phones.

The Stingray crew take Idotee into custody and return to Marineville. Shore decides not to punish Troy for his insubordination, instead thanking him for his bravery in the line of duty.

Production
The galleon scale model was built by the AP Films special effects department under the supervision of effects director Derek Meddings, while the puppet-size decks were designed by art director Bob Bell. Both the galleon model and the deck sets were re-used in the episode "Set Sail for Adventure", where they appear as Admiral Denver's ship.

Although Idotee is named in the script, the character does not identify himself in dialogue, instead telling Shore and Phones that his name "is of no consequence".

The episode's incidental music was recorded on 25 October 1963 at Pye Studios with a 30-member band. Music for "The Golden Sea" was recorded in the same session.

Reception
Writing for the fanzine Andersonic, Vincent Law compares "The Ghost Ship" to the episodes "A Nut for Marineville", "Pink Ice" and "Invisible Enemy" for the way the characters react to the threat posed by Idotee. He notes that in the latter two episodes "the bottom line [is] 'blast them before they blast us'" while the first two "riff on pretty much the same theme, the stock response to the unknown usually being to shoot first." Law also praises the flute music that accompanies the first appearance of the galleon, describing the piece as "unforgettable" and arguing that it "perfectly encapsulates the whole series."

References

External links

1964 British television episodes
Science fiction television episodes
Stingray (1964 TV series)